Dagmar Gabriele Wöhrl (née Winkler; born 5 May 1954) is a German politician of the Christian Social Union in Bavaria (CSU). She has served as Chairwoman of the Committee for Economic Cooperation and Development of the German Bundestag. She was also a member of the 'Parliamentary Friendship Group for Relations with Arabic-Speaking States' in the Middle East.

Wöhrl is the member of UNICEF National Committee of Germany.

Early life and career
Born in Stein, Bavaria, Wöhrl represented Germany in various beauty pageants: the 1973 Miss Universe beauty pageant where she did not place; the Miss International 1977 beauty pageant where she placed as first runner-up; the Miss World 1977 beauty pageant (after she won the Miss Germany beauty pageant 1977) where she placed as second runner-up; and the 1977 Miss Europe beauty pageant (held in March 1978 having been postponed in 1977, yet still called Miss Europe 1977) where she placed as first runner-up.

Political career

In 1994, 1998, 2002, 2005, 2009 and 2013, Wöhrl was elected to the German Bundestag, representing Nuremberg North. In the first government of Chancellor Angela Merkel between 2005 and 2009, she served as Parliamentary State Secretary in the Federal Ministry of Economics and Technology under ministers Michael Glos (2005–2009) and Karl-Theodor zu Guttenberg (2009).

In the negotiations to form a coalition government following the 2009 federal elections, Wöhrl was part of the CDU/CSU delegation in the working group on economic affairs and energy policy, led by Guttenberg and Rainer Brüderle. She later served as Chairwoman of the Committee for Economic Cooperation and Development of the German Bundestag. She was also a member of the 'Parliamentary Friendship Group for Relations with Arabic-Speaking States' in the Middle East, which is in charge of maintaining inter-parliamentary relations with Bahrain, Irak, Yemen, Jordan, Qatar, Kuwait, Lebanon, Oman, Saudi Arabia, Syria, United Arab Emirates, and the Palestinian territories.

From 2009, Wöhrl also served on the Committee on Cultural and Media Affairs, where she was her parliamentary group's rapporteur on creative industries.

In March 2015, Wöhrl accompanied German President Joachim Gauck on a state visit to Peru. In addition, she joined the delegations of Federal Minister of Economic Cooperation and Development Gerd Müller to Nigeria (2014), Ghana (2015), Liberia (2015) and the Central African Republic (2015).

In April 2016, Wöhrl announced that she would not stand in the 2017 federal elections but instead resign from active politics by the end of the parliamentary term.

Political positions

Development policy
When several Western countries froze their official development assistance for Uganda in response to the country's Anti-Homosexuality Act in 2014, Wöhrl warned that "stopping all the aid would only hit the poorest of poor once again."

Peace-keeping on the African continent
During her time in parliament, Wöhrl voted in favor of German participation in United Nations peacekeeping missions as well as in United Nations-mandated European Union peacekeeping missions on the African continent, such as in Somalia – both Operation Atalanta and EUTM Somalia – (2009, 2010, 2012, 2013, 2014 and 2015), Darfur/Sudan (2010, 2011, 2012, 2013, 2014 and 2015), South Sudan (2011, 2012, 2013, 2014 and 2015), Mali – both EUTM Mali and MINUSMA – (2013, 2014, 2015 and 2016), the Central African Republic (2014), and Liberia (2015). She abstained from the vote on extending the mandate for Operation Atalanta in 2011.

European integration
On 27 February 2015, Wöhrl voted against the Merkel government's proposal for a four-month extension of Greece's bailout; in doing so, she joined a record number of 29 dissenters from the CDU/CSU parliamentary group who expressed skepticism about whether the Greek government under Prime Minister Alexis Tsipras could be trusted to deliver on its reform pledges. On 17 July, she voted against the government's proposal to negotiate a third bailout for Greece.

Other activities

Television appearances
By early 2017, media reported that Wöhrl would be joining the jury of Die Höhle der Löwen, a VOX reality television format featuring entrepreneurs pitching their business ideas in order to secure investment finance from a panel of venture capitalists.

Corporate boards (selection)
 Bank J. Safra Sarasin, Member of the Supervisory Board
 DORMERO Hotel AG, Member of the Supervisory Board
 Nürnberger Krankenversicherung, Member of the Supervisory Board
 Nürnberger Lebensversicherung, Member of the Supervisory Board
 GIZ, Member of the Supervisory Board (–2017)
 Deutschlandradio, Member of the Supervisory Board (–2017)
 German Federal Film Board (FFA), Member of the Supervisory Board (–2017)
 German Investment and Development Corporation (DEG), Member of the Supervisory Board (2005–2009)
 Bank Sarasin AG, Frankfurt/Main, Member of the Advisory Board (2009–2013)
 Nürnberger Allgemeine Versicherungs-AG, Member of the Supervisory Board (2009–2011)

Non-profit organizations (selection)
 German Association for Small and Medium-Sized Businesses (BVMW), Member of the Advisory Board
 Cultural and Social Foundation International Young Orchestra Academy, Member of the Board of Trustees
 Chamber of Commerce and Industry of Nuremberg, Member of the General Meeting
 Hochschule für Musik Nürnberg, Member of the University Council 
 Memorial to the Murdered Jews of Europe, Member of the Board of Trustees
 Tarabya Academy, Member of the Advisory Board (–2017)
 Center for European Economic Research (ZEW), Member of the Board of Trustees (2005–2009)
 Aktion Deutschland Hilft (Germany's Relief Coalition), Member of the Board of Trustees (–2017)
 UNICEF National Committee of Germany, Member
 Bavarian AIDS Foundation, Member of the Board of Trustees
 Franconian International School, Member of the Board of Trustees (2009–2013)

Personal life

Wöhrl is the wife of German CEO Hans Rudolf Wöhrl. In 2001, she was subject of much media coverage after her younger son Emanuel died because of an accident. Her older son Marcus ran for the European Parliament in 2004.

References

External links 
 Official website
 Biography from German Bundestag

1954 births
21st-century German women politicians
Female members of the Bundestag
German beauty pageant winners
German Protestants
Living people
Members of the Bundestag for Bavaria
Miss Europe
Miss International 1977 delegates
Miss Universe 1973 contestants
Miss World 1977 delegates
People from Fürth (district)
Recipients of the Cross of the Order of Merit of the Federal Republic of Germany
University of Erlangen-Nuremberg alumni
Members of the Bundestag 2013–2017
Members of the Bundestag 2009–2013
Members of the Bundestag 2005–2009
Members of the Bundestag 2002–2005
Members of the Bundestag 1998–2002
Members of the Bundestag 1994–1998
Members of the Bundestag for the Christian Social Union in Bavaria
20th-century German women
Beauty queen-politicians